China Labour Bulletin (CLB) is a non-governmental organization that promotes and defends workers' rights in the People's Republic of China. It is based in Hong Kong and was founded in 1994 by labour activist Han Dongfang.

Overview
CLB advocates stronger protection for the rights for Chinese workers, and has expressed optimism that their conditions will improve through peaceful and legal action.

CLB supports the development of democratic trade unions in China and the enforcement of the PRC's labour laws. In addition, CLB seeks the official recognition in China of international standards and conventions providing for workers' freedom of association and the right to free collective bargaining.

In 2002 CLB established a labour rights litigation programme designed to give workers the chance to seek redress for their grievances through the PRC's court system. The organization provides legal advice for workers and arranges for mainland Chinese lawyers to handle their cases. By October 2007, it had taken on about 140 cases involving such issues as non-payment of wages, industrial injury, and redundancy (unemployment) payments. It also addresses the problem of employment discrimination, in particular, raising awareness of and combating discrimination against the estimated 120 million hepatitis B positive Chinese.

In 2005, CLB set up a programme to promote collective bargaining and the use of factory-wide, legally enforceable collective labour contracts as a means of empowering workers, protecting their legal rights, and enhancing industrial relations.

CLB has published five English language and ten Chinese language research reports on a range of issues including the workers' movement in China, migrant workers, child labour, coal mining accidents, and the silicosis epidemic among China's gemstone workers.

In March 2021, CLB documented a series of accidents in the context of workplace safety, which was ignored by the local trade union for allegedly complying to the State's "priorities in eliminating rural poverty and instilling political loyalty".

See also
Labor Contract Law of the People's Republic of China
China Labor Watch
Hepatitis B in China
Hulu Culture

References

External links 
 China Labour Bulletin (English)

Human rights in China
Organizations established in 1994
1994 establishments in China
Labor rights groups
Political organisations based in Hong Kong